Queensland Country Life was a monthly newspaper published in Brisbane, Queensland, Australia.

History
The first issue was published on 28 March 1900, replacing an earlier newspaper, the Australian Tropiculturalist and Stockbreeder. The newspaper was primarily focussed on agriculture but sought to cover a wide range of topics likely to be of interest to rural readers.

The last issue was published on 1 December 1910.

Digitisation 
The paper has been digitised as part of the Australian Newspapers Digitisation Program  of the National Library of Australia.

References

External links
 

Newspapers published in Brisbane
Defunct newspapers published in Queensland
Publications established in 1900
1900 establishments in Australia
1910 disestablishments in Australia
Publications disestablished in 1910